Diospyros singaporensis is a tree in the family Ebenaceae. Inflorescences bear up to three flowers. The tree is named after Singapore. Habitat is lowland mixed dipterocarp forests. D. singaporensis is found in Peninsular Malaysia and Borneo.

References

singaporensis
Plants described in 1933
Trees of Malaya
Trees of Borneo